Derek Murray (born 26 November 1960 in Dunfermline) is a Scottish retired footballer who played left-back. Murray began his career in the early 1980s with Dundee United, making sixteen appearances over a four-year period before joining Motherwell. More of a regular at Fir Park, Murray appeared in nearly 100 league matches before joining Raith Rovers in 1988, making over 80 league appearances before retiring in 1991. Murray moved back to Oakley United, who he had played for at youth level, as assistant manager following the end of his playing career.

External links
 
 https://www.arabarchive.co.uk/player.php?id=40

1960 births
Footballers from Dunfermline
Living people
Scottish footballers
Scottish Football League players
Dundee United F.C. players
Motherwell F.C. players
Raith Rovers F.C. players
Association football fullbacks